Acacia leiophylla, commonly known as coast golden wattle, is a tree of the family Mimosaceae native to South Australia and Western Australia.

Description
It has flexuose and glabrous branchlets. Like most species of Acacia it has phyllodes rather than true leaves.

Taxonomy
It was described by botanist George Bentham in the London Journal of Botany in 1842. Similar in appearance to A. pycnantha, it can be distinguished by its lighter phyllodes.

Distribution
It is situated along the south coast of South Australia where its range extends from around Coffin Bay on the Eyre Peninsula in the west to around Mount Gambier in the east where it is mostly found growing in sandy or loamy soils as a part of open scrub communities and is often associated with Mallee Eucalyptus species.

See also
List of Acacia species

References

leiophylla
Fabales of Australia
Flora of South Australia
Taxa named by George Bentham
Plants described in 1842